The Synchronized Swimming Competition events took place at the 1987 Pan American Games, held from August 7 to August 23, 1987 in Indianapolis, United States. There were three medal events. Events were held at the Indiana University Natatorium.

Solo

Duet

Team

Medal table

References
 Sports 123
 USA Synchro Results

1987
1987 in synchronized swimming
Events at the 1987 Pan American Games
1987